Molly Jess Robson (born 28 March 1942) is a former Australian politician.

She was born in Sydney and received a Bachelor of Administration, majoring in Industrial Relations. From 1983 to 1990 she was secretary of the Queensland Consumers Association. In 1989 she was elected to the Queensland Legislative Assembly as the Labor member for Springwood. She was appointed Minister for Environment and Heritage in 1992, but in 1995 she lost her seat to Liberal candidate Luke Woolmer .

References

1942 births
Living people
Members of the Queensland Legislative Assembly
Australian Labor Party members of the Parliament of Queensland
Women members of the Queensland Legislative Assembly